Ziad El Sheiwi (born 11 March 2004) is an Austrian professional footballer who plays as a left-back for Austrian Bundesliga club Austria Wien.

Club career
A former youth academy player of Team Wiener Linien, El Sheiwi moved to Austria Wien in 2011. He signed his first professional contract with the club in July 2021. He made his professional debut for club's reserve side on 23 July 2021 in a 1–1 draw against Wacker Innsbruck.

International career
Born in Austria, El Sheiwi is of Egyptian descent. He is a current Austrian youth international. On 8 October 2020, he made his debut for national under-17 team in a 1–0 friendly win against Slovenia.

Career statistics

References

External links
 Ziad El Sheiwi at OFB 
 

2004 births
Living people
Austrian footballers
Austria youth international footballers
Austrian people of Egyptian descent
Austrian Football Bundesliga players
2. Liga (Austria) players
FK Austria Wien players
Association football fullbacks